The Huntingdonshire Women's cricket team is the women's representative cricket team for the English historic county of Huntingdonshire. They play their home games at Cricketfield Lane in Ramsey, and are captained by Emily Banks. In the Women's County Championship, Huntingdonshire played as a combined team with Cambridgeshire, as Cambridgeshire and Huntingdonshire Women, but the two counties played separately in the 2014 Women's Twenty20 Cup, and Cambridgeshire have competed individually in the Twenty20 tournament since. In 2021, Huntingdonshire re-joined the Women's Twenty20 Cup, after playing in the East of England Championship in 2020. They are partnered with the regional side Sunrisers.

History
Huntingdonshire played their first recorded match in 1887, against Bedfordshire.  In 2009, Huntingdonshire joined the Women's Twenty20 Cup and in 2010 joined the Women's County Championship, as Cambridgeshire and Huntingdonshire Women. In 2014, however, in the Twenty20 Cup only, the two sides split and competed individually. Huntingdonshire finished bottom of Division Four in the 2014 Women's Twenty20 Cup. After this, they did not compete in any national competitions until 2021, when they competed in the 2021 Women's Twenty20 Cup, in the East Group, finishing 5th. They finished bottom of their group in the 2022 Women's Twenty20 Cup, but did win one match, against Buckinghamshire. They have also competed in the regional East of England Championship since 2020, with their best finish coming in their first season, when they finished third in the 45-over competition.

Players

Current squad
Based on appearances in the 2022 season.

Seasons

Women's Twenty20 Cup

See also
 Huntingdonshire County Cricket Club
 Cambridgeshire and Huntingdonshire Women cricket team
 Cambridgeshire Women cricket team
 Sunrisers (women's cricket)

References

Women's cricket teams in England
Cricket in Huntingdonshire